Neil Holding (born 15 December 1960) is an English former professional rugby league footballer who played in the 1970s, 1980s and 1990s, and coached in the 1990s.

Playing career

St Helens
Holding made his debut for St Helens in October 1977 against Swinton.

Holding played  in St Helens' 7–13 defeat by Widnes in the 1978 BBC2 Floodlit Trophy Final during the 1978–79 season at Knowsley Road, St Helens on Tuesday 12 December 1978.

Holding played  in St Helens 0–16 defeat by Warrington in the 1982 Lancashire Cup Final during the 1982–83 season at Central Park, Wigan on Saturday 23 October 1982, and played  in the 28-16 victory over Wigan in the 1984 Lancashire Cup Final during the 1984–85 season at Central Park, Wigan on Sunday 28 October 1984.

Holding played  in St Helens' 18–19 defeat by Halifax in the 1987 Challenge Cup Final during the 1986–87 season at Wembley Stadium, London on Saturday 2 May 1987.

Holding played , and scored a drop goal in St Helens' 15–14 victory over Leeds in the 1987–88 John Player Special Trophy Final during the 1987–88 season at Central Park, Wigan on Saturday 9 January 1988.

Later career
In September 1990, Holding was signed by Rochdale Hornets for a fee of £50,000. In February 1991, he was appointed as player-coach at Rochdale. Following the club's relegation from the First Division at the end of the 1990–91 season, he was replaced as coach by Stan Gittins.

In August 1991, he was signed by Oldham in exchange for Brett Clark and Ronnie Duane.

International honours
Holding won one cap for England while at St Helens in 1980 against Wales, and won caps for Great Britain while at St Helens on the 1984 Lions tour against Australia (3 matches) and New Zealand.

Post-playing career
After retiring from rugby league, Holding worked as a groundsman at St Helens. In 1998, he left the club to take up a similar role at Liverpool football club. He worked at Liverpool until 2014, when he left the club to set up his own gardening business.

Neil Holding is a St Helens R.F.C. Hall of Fame inductee.

References

External links
Profile at saints.org.uk
(archived by web.archive.org) Saints snap up Holding

1960 births
Living people
Bradford Bulls players
England national rugby league team players
English rugby league coaches
English rugby league players
Great Britain national rugby league team players
Lancashire rugby league team players
Oldham R.L.F.C. coaches
Oldham R.L.F.C. players
Place of birth missing (living people)
Rochdale Hornets coaches
Rochdale Hornets players
Rugby league five-eighths
Rugby league halfbacks
Rugby league players from St Helens, Merseyside
St Helens R.F.C. players